The Greeks and the Trojans Fighting over the Body of Patroclus is an oil painting by Antoine Wiertz. Several versions of the painting exist. The first was made in year 1836 (Musée des beaux-arts de Liège).

Description
The painting's dimensions are 395 x 703 centimeters.
It is in the collection of the Antoine Wiertz Museum, one of the Royal Museums of Fine Arts of Belgium.

Gallery

References

1836 paintings